The Team routine competition of the synchronised swimming at the 2012 European Aquatics Championships was held on May 25 with the technical and free routine. The final was held on May 26.

Medalists

Results
The preliminary rounds were held at 12:00 and 19:00 local time on May 25. The final was held at 19:00 on May 26.

References

2012 European Aquatics Championships